The 2012–2013 season of the Russian Bandy Super League was played from November 2013 until March 2014, when the Russian champions were named after a play-off.

Teams

League table

Knock-out stage

Matches

References

Sources
 http://www.rusbandy.ru/

2012 in Russian sport
2013 in Russian sport
2012 in bandy
2013 in bandy
Seasons in Russian bandy